Ericeia pertendens is a moth in the family Erebidae first described by Francis Walker in 1858. It is found from the Indo-Australian tropics to the Solomon Islands.

The wingspan is 37–45 mm. The ground colour of the forewing is ashy grey

The larvae feed on Berchemia and possibly Cassia species. Young larvae are whitish, but later instars become blackish. Full-grown larvae rest along sticks or twigs. Pupation takes place in a slight cocoon of silk amongst litter on the ground.

References

Moths described in 1858
Moths of Asia
Moths of Japan
Ericeia